The 40th Airlift Squadron is a United States Air Force unit based at Dyess Air Force Base, Texas. It currently flies the Lockheed Martin C-130J Super Hercules aircraft. Nicknamed the Screaming Eagles, it is one of the most decorated airlift units in the U.S. Air Force.

Origins
On 18 February 1942, the squadron was activated as the 40th Transport Squadron at Duncan Field, Texas and was assigned to the 317th Transport Group three days later. Beginning with only second lieutenant Fred H. Schomburg, a squadron commander and eight enlisted men, the squadron slowly took shape, and in about four months was full-sized. It then transferred to Bowman Field, Kentucky where it began flying the Douglas C-47 Skytrain. The development of World War II drove a rapid training and deployment schedule, and on 6 December 1942, the 40th moved to Laurinburg-Maxton Army Air Base, North Carolina to begin staging for its move to the Pacific. A few days later, it left North Carolina for the Brookley AFB, Alabama where it received thirteen new C-47s, which the squadron flew to California.

World War II operations
On 5 January 1943, the squadron left California for the Southwest Pacific Theater. Two days later it landed at Brisbane, Australia, where it came under the command of the Fifth Air Force. A short time later, it moved to Garbutt Field, Townsville, Australia, its first permanent overseas home.

Buna
In the Buna campaign, the 40th ferried food, ammunition, equipment, and reinforcements to Allied troops, and evacuated the wounded to hospitals on its return flights. As the battle of Buna neared its end, the fight for Wau was just beginning.

Wau
In Wau, Papua New Guinea, the squadron provided support for the Australian commandos of Kanga Force who were engaging the Japanese in battle. The squadron pilots became accustomed to landing on the 3,000-foot dirt strip at Wau, which had a 12% grade heading directly at Mount Kaindi. They transported reinforcements, ammunition, artillery pieces, food, and other supplies. The 40th squadron experienced its first combat casualties when a crew crashed while attempting to land on 18 January.

On 29 January, the Japanese launched a full-scale assault on the airstrip and managed to reach one end of the runway, which they subjected to constant mortar fire. At times, planes circled the area while the Australians fought the Japanese back far enough into the jungle to allow the aircraft to land. Many of the reinforcements flown into the strip had to jump from the planes straight into battle. However, by the end of 30 January, most of the Japanese attacks had been repulsed, and the airstrip remained under Allied control for the rest of the war. As a result of its efforts at Wau.

Consolidation
The 40th subsequently established and operated air routes across Australia, New Guinea, and the Solomon Islands. It airlifted troops, reinforcements, supplies, and equipment into combat, and evacuated the wounded. It dropped paratroopers in airborne assault operations, airdropped equipment, and supplies. Secondary missions included carrying captured Japanese troops to rear areas, transporting commanders to and from combat areas, and conducting training with airborne troops.

Assault on Lae
The 40th's next major battle occurred on 5 September, when Allied Forces assaulted the island of Lae. The squadron joined the rest of the 317th Troop Carrier Group in an air assault on the Nadzab plain. General Kenney, Fifth Air Force commander, later said, "I truly don’t believe that another air force in the world today could have put this over as perfectly as the Fifth Air Force did. 302 airplanes in all, taking off from eight different fields in the Moresby and Dobodura areas, made a rendezvous right on the nose over Marilinan, flying through clouds, passes in the mountains, and over the top. Not a single squadron did any circling or stalling around, but all slid into place like clockwork and proceeded on the final flight down the Watut Valley, turned to the right down the Markham River and went directly to the target."

Move across New Guinea
As Allied troops pressed westward across New Guinea, the squadron moved to Ward Airdrome at Port Moresby on 6 October 1943, placing them closer to combat, and eliminating many of the long flights back to Australia. The 317th Group soon became known as the "Jungle Skippers". Heavily loaded and unarmed, the C-47s were often flown unconventionally by their hard-pressed crews. Counting on stealth and surprise to help even the odds, the pilots slipped their transports down river valleys and through mountain gaps, skipping and skimming across the jungle and rain forests. Through the rest of 1943 and into 1944, the 40th continued its support of the Allied advance. On 21 April 1944, it moved to Finschhafen, New Guinea, and again in May to Cyclops Field, Hollandia.

Invasion of the Philippines
During Operation Table Tennis, the 40th airdropped troops on the island of Noemfoor during July 1944. In November, it airdropped supplies to American troops on the island of Leyte in the Philippines. In January 1945, it transferred to Leyte, from whence it made covert airdrops to Filipino guerrillas and commandos operating throughout the island chain.

The squadron's last major action of World War II came on 16 February with the invasion of Luzon. The 317th Group was tasked with dropping the 503rd Parachute Infantry Regiment troopers onto Corregidorc. The only suitable drop zones were an old American parade ground and a golf course. At precisely 0830, 51 C-47s began wheeling over the two small drop zones in counter-rotating, orbits dropping eight men per pass. With 317th Group commander Colonel Jack Lackey in the lead plane, the 39th and 40th Squadrons dropped on the former golf course while the 41st and 46th Squadrons rushed to drop on the parade ground. Most of the aircraft were hit by intense ground fire, but none were lost. For its efforts in the assault, the squadron won its second Distinguished Unit Citation.

The squadron also participated in the airdrop of the 11th Airborne Division on Mindoro Island, and the airdrop of the 511th Parachute Infantry Regiment on Los Banos, on the Batangas Peninsula of Luzon. In February 1945, it carried the "most valuable cargo ever moved in the Southwest Pacific Theater", when it brought 120 doctors and nurses to Mabalacat to care for American prisoners liberated from Japanese prisoner of war camps after three years of imprisonment. In March, it moved to Clark Field, Philippines, where it dealt with raids by fanatical Japanese who penetrated security around Clark to make hit-and-run attacks against the barracks and flight line.

On 15 April, the squadron launched a short career as a strategic bombing squadron. Japanese troops holed up on Carabao Island, Cavite were threatening Allied shipping. Conventional bombing failed to make an impact, so the 40th's C-47s were loaded with 55-gallon drums of napalm and were credited with killing 2700 Japanese.

Move to Okinawa
In August, the squadron moved to Naha Airfield, Okinawa. On 29 August, following the US's atomic bombings of Hiroshima and Nagasaki, four 40th C-47s flew from Naha to Tokyo carrying an advance party for the surrender ceremony, the first US aircraft to land on the Japanese mainland at the end of hostilities. The occasion was marred when the lead aircraft misinterpreted the wind direction while landing, causing the entire formation to land downwind, much to the consternation of the Japanese commander who had assembled his staff at the 'correct' end of the runway to greet them.

Occupation of Japan
After the Japanese surrender, the 40th took part in the occupation of Japan. In 1947, it received new Douglas C-54 Skymasters. In May, 1948 it became the 40th Troop Carrier Squadron, Heavy, and was assigned to Far East Air Forces.

European operations

Berlin Airlift

In June 1948, the Soviet Union attempted to force its wartime Allies, now cold war enemies, France, Great Britain, and the United States from the city of Berlin.  The USSR blocked the Western Allies' railway, road, and canal access to the sectors of Berlin under Western control . In response, the Allied powers immediately began an airlift into the city, but it soon became apparent that they needed more aircraft. In September, the 39th and 41st Squadrons from the 317th Troop Carrier Group were transferred to Germany. In November, the 40th followed. Soon after arriving in Germany, the 40th began flying into Berlin from Wiesbaden Air Base, Germany, before transferring to RAF Celle, Germany in December. From the time the 40th began operating at Wiesbaden until shortly after the Berlin blockade was lifted the following summer, the squadron flew approximately 10,550 round trips to Berlin transporting a grand total of 100,000 tons of supplies into the besieged city. When the Berlin Airlift ended, the entire 317th Group, including the 40th Squadron, was inactivated at RAF Celle on 14 September 1949.

Supporting NATO
The squadron was reactivated on 14 July 1952 as the 40th Troop Carrier Squadron, Medium at Rhein-Main Air Base, Germany. After its reactivation, the 40th joined its reactivated sister squadrons, the 39th and 41st, under control of the 317th Troop Carrier Wing supporting the North Atlantic Treaty Organization while flying the Fairchild C-119 Flying Boxcar. In May 1953, the 40th transferred from Rhein-Main Air Base to Neubiberg Air Base, Germany. In October, the squadron began operations as part of the Air Logistics Service, a regularly scheduled series of airlift flights throughout Europe, North Africa, and the Middle East which later became known as channel missions. In addition to its regular airlift schedule, the 40th airdropped 45,000 sandbags near the town of Regensburg, Germany, for emergency flood relief, transported supplies into India and Pakistan following floods and stood alert during the 1956 Arab-Israeli War. During this crisis, the 40th were staged to advanced fields with a United Nations Emergency Force.

C-130 and move to France
In October 1957, the squadron received its first Lockheed C-130 Hercules. Two months later, the squadron transferred from Neubiberg Air Base to Évreux-Fauville Air Base, France. The 40th completed its transition into the C-130 in June 1958, just in time for the new plane to gain its first taste of action.

Lebanese Civil War
When Lebanon exploded into civil war in July 1958, the 40th both airlifted personnel, equipment, and supplies of the 24th Infantry Division into Beirut, and deployed aircraft to Incirlik Combined Defense Installation, Turkey. The squadron continued to fly into Lebanon until October 1959 when the civil war ended and the troops moved out.

Congo Crisis
On 1 July 1960, Belgium granted the Congo its independence. Within a week, the country had descended into anarchy. The locals began slaughtering Europeans, and looting and burning all European built buildings, businesses, and facilities. When Belgium sent in its Dragon Rouge Paratroopers, they responded with similar ferocity against the local population. The United Nations quickly moved to stop the carnage and restore order to the area. On 8 July, the 40th, as part of the 322d Air Division, went on alert for action in Operation New Tape, the Congo airlift. From July, and well into the next year, the squadron flew across most of Africa carrying troops and hundreds of tons of cargo into the Congo. From the very beginning, all 40th aircrews were involved in the airlift. The first UN aircraft to land in the Congo was a 40th C-130 carrying Lt Col Francis E. Merritt, commander of the 40th. He was tasked as the combat Airlift Support Unit commander. Most of the airport facilities had been destroyed and the one forklift which Lt Col Merritt's crew brought with them soon broke. Despite the many problems and continuing unrest, including heavy gun battles around the airport, the ground crews under Lt Col Merritt continued to unload each arriving C-130, frequently by hand,. As the airlift developed, missions spread to include landings at dirt strips and runways throughout the region. Crews from the 40th found themselves eating C-rations cooked at tiny jungle airstrips. They carried thousands of refugees and troops from nations as far away as Algeria, South Africa, Morocco, and Somalia. The massive operation in support of the United Nations continued until the summer of 1961.

Iranian earthquake

The 40th continued its humanitarian efforts in 1962, when a magnitude 7.1 earthquake hit north-western Iran. Within hours of the disaster, 40th aircraft were in the air loaded with supplies for the people of Iran. The 40th flew nearly a third of all missions flown into Iran, carrying rations, tents, blankets, a 100-bed hospital, and several helicopters.

Sino-Indian War
In 1962, the 40th took part in another little publicized, but highly critical mission, airlift operations in the Sino-Indian War. On 21 November 1962, twelve C-130s departed France on a mass deployment to New Delhi, India. The deployed to support the Indian government in its defense against an invasion by Communist China. All of the aircraft arrived in New Delhi on 23 November, twenty-four hours ahead of schedule. When China invaded India, the Indian Air Force's Russian-built transports proved incapable of carrying troops and equipment into the high altitude Himalayan airfields. The 40th's C-130As easily handled the altitude, and quickly carried all of the Indian reinforcements and equipment into the area. During the first eleven days, the twelve crews carried over five hundred tons of supplies and over 5000 troops for a total of 203 sorties without an aborted launch. The mission was originally to last only a few months, but as usual, stretched out for over a year. The Indian government later stated that the efforts of the American C-130s prevented the Chinese from gaining any advantage after their initial invasion.

Skopje earthquake

As the Indian airlift wound down in 1963, the squadron was again called upon for humanitarian assistance, this time to Belgrade, Yugoslavia. An earthquake had devastated the town of Skopje, killing and injuring thousands of people. Three crews from the 40th flew in the initial group of C-130s carrying relief supplies into the area.

United States

Move to Ohio
In November 1963, the 317th Troop Carrier Group began planning its move from Évreux-Fauville Air Base, France to its new home, Lockbourne Air Force Base, Ohio. In June 1964, the 40th returned to the United States for the first time since January 1943. During its many years away from the United States, the squadron had flown combat operations stretching from the Far East to the Middle East, and humanitarian missions throughout Europe, the Middle East, and Africa.

Invasion of the Dominican Republic
In April 1965, the Dominican Republic elected a socialist president. The United States encouraged the Dominican military to stage a coup that degenerated into a civil war between the army and supporters of the democratic system. President Lyndon Johnson used this situation as an excuse for American intervention. The initial plan called for a massive airdrop invasion of the island by over one hundred C-130s. Orders went out, and the 40th deployed all of its planes to Pope Air Force Base, North Carolina, where it joined the invasion force. After the formation became airborne, the president changed the invasion from an airdrop to an air land assault. The 40th diverted into Ramey Air Force Base, Puerto Rico to allow the crews to rerig the loads, then flew into the Dominican Republic to combat offload the cargo. For the remainder of the operation, the 40th flew from both Pope and Ramey. When the fighting ended in June, the 40th returned to Lockbourne.

Beginning deployments
In 1964, the 40th began Operation Cross Switch rotations to Europe. During these rotations, the entire squadron deployed for two to four months each year from Ohio to Europe to augment the theater airlift forces. At first, the rotational base was located at Évreux-Fauville, France, but after the French left NATO in 1966, the rotation was split between RAF Mildenhall, England, and Rhein-Main Air Base, Germany. At the same time that the squadron began its regular rotation to Europe, it also began a regular rotation of crews and planes to Panama. The rotation to Panama continued into the 1980s when the Air National Guard assumed responsibility for it.

In October 1965, a C-130 Replacement Training Unit was established at Lockbourne. The 40th devoted a portion of its training to the unit.

The Sixties and Seventies
The late 1960s and early 1970s were a time of intense social unrest in the United States. On several occasions, the 40th carried troops into cities ravaged by riots or massive anti-Vietnam War demonstrations. The airlift of riot control troops, known as Operation Garden Plot took the 40th from Detroit to Washington, DC, to New Haven, Connecticut. As the nation began to heal in the seventies these operations slowly dwindled, then faded away. The social changes that swept through American culture in the sixties impacted the squadron in the seventies. In July 1970, Lockbourne Air Force Base received its first women. The base integrated the women into existing squadrons because it lacked a female-only squadron, which many other bases had. At first the commander were unsure of the roles of these new recruits, but soon found positions for them in squadron administration. In 1973, the All-Volunteer Force came into effect, and with higher pay, better living conditions, and improved facilities as the Air Force faced the fact that, if it did not improve the life style of its troops, they would leave.

The seventies also saw an attempt to form "hard crews," a dismal failure; the flight system, a management nightmare; and the removal of maintenance from the squadron, then its return, then its removal again. The seventies also brought the move of all C-130s into Military Airlift Command, a reversal of the consolidation into Tactical Air Command which occurred in the sixties.

Humanitarian operations
Through all of the changes, the mission of the 40th remained the same. Hurricane Camille, the worst hurricane in the history of the United States, hit the east coast in August 1969. In the first of a series of hurricane relief efforts, the 40th launched aircraft full of supplies for the stricken area. Hurricanes continued to decimate the east coast of the United States, and the 40th continued to respond. Hurricanes David and Frederick in 1979, Hurricane Hugo in 1989, and Hurricane Andrew in 1992 all brought out the 40th on missions of mercy. From 1969 on, the 40th flew humanitarian mission for a litany of disasters. Mud slides in Bogotá, Colombia in September 1970, an earthquake on the border between Peru and Ecuador a month later, floods in Bolivia, and a volcanic eruption in Nicaragua in 1971, floods in Virginia and Pennsylvania in July 1972, and an earthquake in Nicaragua six months later, in 1973 Operation Authentic Assistance, a massive drought and famine relief operation in Mali, an earthquake in Turkey in 1976, blizzards in New York in 1977, and again in Massachusetts in 1979 all proved the squadron's worth as an instrument of humanitarian relief as well as war. This is only a small handful of the many humanitarian relief operations throughout the history of the 40th. To name them all would take far too much space, but this short list illustrates the immeasurable service the squadron has given representing the United States to the world.

Pope Air Force Base
In June 1971, the 40th began preparations for the 317th Tactical Airlift Wing's move-this time to Pope Air Force Base where it replaced the 778th Tactical Airlift Squadron, which inactivated and transferred its personnel and aircraft to the 40th. The move to Pope brought some mission changes as well. The squadron lost its obligation as a Replacement Training Unit, but gained the Adverse Weather Aerial Delivery System (AWADS) mission. Previously, C-130 squadrons at several bases had AWADS, but it was gradually consolidated into the three squadrons at Pope. The 40th also gained a rotational commitment to Southeast Asia in addition to its regular rotations to Europe and Panama. It soon became common for crews to spend ninety days in Germany, come home for a few weeks, deploy to Panama for six weeks, come home again for a short rest, then depart for the Pacific.

Vietnam deployments
The 40th crews were first based at Ching Chuan Kang Air Base, Taiwan, and came under the control of the 61st Tactical Airlift Squadron. In 1974, they moved to U-Tapao Royal Thai Navy Airfield, Thailand. From both bases, they flew high altitude AWADS drops in South Vietnam, as well as standard airlift missions. As many as eight 40th crews could be in the region at one time taking part in combat actions including the sieges of An Lộc and Phnom Penh, and Operations Easter Bunny and Constant Guard. The squadron received no official recognition for its involvement in the Vietnam War because many of its action in the war came after the United States officially ended its participation. At the end of 1974, the 40th pulled its crews out of Southeast Asia, and turned over its responsibility for the adverse weather airdrop mission to the Thai Air Force and Bird Air-a regional civilian contract service flying C-130s.

Iranian Revolution
In 1979, while the squadron was on rotation in Europe, radical Muslims overthrew the Shah of Iran. The 40th flew into Iran rescuing American citizens working in the country. The squadron flew from Incirlik Air Base, Turkey and Tehran, Iran into small dirt strips carrying in supplies and evacuating both civilian and military personnel.

Invasion of Grenada
The squadron gained its first combat experience in nearly a decade in 1983. Fighting among various factions among the island of Grenada's communist government led to fear that American medical students on the island could be taken hostage. President Ronald Reagan responded with Operation Urgent Fury, an invasion of the island. The 40th provided two of the five crews for the initial airborne assault on Point Salines Airport. After the initial assault, the numerous Squadron crews flew follow on missions into the island carrying troops, supplies, food, and ammunition. On the return trips the crews carried out Cuban soldiers who had been working on several large military construction projects, and the American medical students who has been caught on the island by the unrest. Despite outrage on the part of Liberals Americans, the people of Grenada profusely thanked the United States from rescuing them from a government they did not want.

Invasion of Panama
Relations between the United States and Panama, a former ally of the U.S., deteriorated in the late 1980s. By 1989, the two countries were in nearing a state of undeclared war. That winter, president George H. W. Bush launched a massive invasion-Operation Just Cause-to remove Noriega. On 19 December 1989, the 40th joined the other two Pope squadrons, and the 50th Tactical Airlift Squadron from Little Rock Air Force Base, for a fifteen aircraft airborne assault on Rio Hato Airport, Panama. The aircraft launched for a late night assault of Army Rangers. After flying down the western Caribbean, across Panama, and out over the Pacific, the formation turned and began its run for Rio Hato. The first few aircraft flew unscathed across the drop zone, but Panamanian soldiers quickly found their range and poured a withering ground fire into the formation. After the drop, the formation flew to Howard Air Force Base, Panama where the aircraft received hasty repairs and fuel before launching back to the United States. Many of the planes managed to make it to the coast before landing at commercial airports because of severe battle damage. The squadron continued to support Just Cause into 1990. As the last of the fighting wound down in Panama, the 40th deployed to England for its 60-day rotation to RAF Mildenhall. The squadron returned to Pope in June.

Desert Shield/Desert Storm
On 2 August 1990, the 40th placed its crews on alert. Iraq had just invaded Kuwait, one of the United States' strongest allies in the Middle East. Six days later, the squadron launched all sixteen airplanes, and every member of the squadron to the Middle East. On 9 August, the squadron landed at Masirah Air Base, Oman. Seventeen hours later the squadron launched its first mission in support of the American build up. For the first few weeks the squadron flew up to twenty-hour days carrying cargo throughout the Arabian Peninsula, living out of tents on the barren island of Masirah, known to the squadron as Moon Island. While the living conditions were miserable, and the missions long and tiring, the squadron never gave up.  Everyone pulled together and achieved one great milestone after another making the C-130 the backbone of the war effort.  Without it, the war could never have happened.  While cargo poured into the theater by way of strategic air and sealift, it took the C-130 to distribute it to the troops. In January, the 40th took part in one of the great deceptions in military history.  While the fighters and bombers distracted the Iraqis, the squadron's C-130s carried the 82nd Airborne Division from northeast Saudi Arabia across the Iraqi front line to land the soldiers in the northwest corner of Saudi Arabia. All of these mission were flown under strict radio silence, with no navigational aids. Aircraft flew along corridors, often with little or no visibility at the same altitude as other aircraft flying the return route. When the ground war began in February, the Iraqis found a division on their western flank they thought was in front of them. If not for the 40th, and the other C-130 squadrons, it could not have been done.

Humanitarian operations
In 1991 the squadron was part of Operation Provide Comfort, a humanitarian relief effort to the Kurds in northern Iraq. Following that, it was part of Operation Authentic Assistance, aid to the Baltic Republics of Latvia and Lithuania, Operation Provide Transition, Angolan disarmament and election, then finally, Operation Provide Promise, the United Nations' relief operation to the former nation of Yugoslavia. The squadron flew into the former Yugoslavia from the summer of 1992 until its inactivation in July 1993.

Dyess AFB
On 16 July 1993, the 40th was inactivated. With the United States' victory in the Cold War, the military began to demobilize.  As part of this process, the squadron and its parent organization, the 317th Airlift Wing, were inactivated. At first it appeared that the 40th would be inactive for an indeterminate time, but the Air Force's senior leadership decided to move the squadron's designation to Dyess Air Force Base, Texas.

Lineage
 Constituted as the 40th Transport Squadron on 2 February 1942
 Activated on 18 February 1942
 Redesignated 40th Troop Carrier Squadron on 4 July 1942
 Redesignated 40th Troop Carrier Squadron, Heavy on 21 May 1948
 Inactivated on 14 September 1949
 Redesignated 40th Troop Carrier Squadron, Medium on 3 July 1952
 Activated on 14 July 1952
 Redesignated 40th Troop Carrier Squadron on 1 March 1966
 Redesignated 40th Tactical Airlift Squadron on 1 May 1967
 Redesigated 40th Airlift Squadron on 1 January 1992
 Inactivated on 16 July 1993
 Activated on 1 October 1993

Assignments
 San Antonio Air Depot, 18 February 1942
 317th Transport Group (later 317th Troop Carrier Group), 22 February 1942 – 14 September 1949
 317th Troop Carrier Group, 14 July 1952
 317th Troop Carrier Wing, 12 March 1957
 322d Air Division, 25 September 1958
 317th Troop Carrier Wing (later 317 Tactical Airlift Wing), 15 April 1963 (attached to Detachment 1, 322d Air Division, 24 November 1964 – 19 February 1965; 513th Tactical Airlift Wing, 16 March–26 May 1968, 4 Marsh–7 May 1975; 322d Tactical Airlift Wing, 31 August–17 October 1971, 7 April–16 June 1973; 435th Tactical Airlift Group, 12 January–15 March 1976, 26 April–15 July 1977; 435th Tactical Airlift Wing, 4 October–15 December 1976)
 317th Tactical Airlift Group, 1 October 1978 (attached to 313th Tactical Airlift Group, 29 November 1978 – 16 February 1979)
 317th Tactical Airlift Wing, 1 April 1980 (attached to 313 Tactical Airlift Group, 7 June–8 August 1980, 3 October–16 December 1981, 3 February–14 April 1983, 7 April–17 June 1984, 4 August–16 October 1985, 3 October–16 December 1986, 20 November 1987 – 10 February 1988, 4 February–12 Apr 1989, 31 March–9 April 1990, 8 July–13 August 1991)
 317th Operations Group, 1 January 1992 – 16 July 1993 (attached to 313 Tactical Airlift Group, 28 July–October 1992)
 7th Operations Group, 1 October 1993
 317th Airlift Group, 1 April 1997 – 1 July 2017
 317th Airlift Wing, 1 July 2017 – Present

Stations

 Duncan Field, Texas, 18 February 1942
 Bowman Field, Kentucky, 19 June 1942
 Lawson Field, Georgia, 10 October 1942
 Laurinburg-Maxton Army Air Base, North Carolina, 2–10 December 1942
 Garbutt Field, Australia, 23 January 1943
 Port Moresby Airfield Complex, New Guinea, 4 October 1943
 Finschhafen Airfield, New Guinea, 21 April 1944
 Hollandia Airfield, New Guinea, 22 June 1944
 Leyte, Philippines, 19 November 1944
 Clark Field, Luzon, Philippines, 5 March 1945
 Okinawa, Ryuku Islands, c. 16 August 1945
 Osaka Airport, Japan, 21 October 1945
 Tachikawa Air Base, Japan, 19 January 1946
 Matsushima Air Base, Japan, 17 October 1946
 Tachikawa Air Base, Japan, 1 August–16 November 1948
 Wiesbaden Air Base, Germany, 16 November 1948
 RAF Celle, Germany, 15 December 1948 – 14 September 1949
 Rhein-Main Air Base, Germany, 14 July 1952
 Neubiberg Air Base, Germany, 15 May 1953
 Évreux-Fauville Air Base, France, 6 December 1957 – 20 June 1964
 Lockbourne Air Force Base, Ohio, 20 June 1964 (deployed to Évreux-Fauville Air Base, France, 24 November 1964 – 19 February 1965; RAF Mildenhall, England, 16 March–26 May 1968)
 Pope Air Force Base, North Carolina, 31 August 1971 – 16 July 1993 (deployed to Rhein-Main Air Base, Germany, 31 August–17 October 1971, 7 April–16 June 1973, 4 October–15 December 1976; RAF Mildenhall, England, 4 March–16 May 1975, 12 January–15 March 1976, 26 April–15 July 1977, 29 November 1978 – 16 February 1979, 7 June–6 August 1980, 3 October–12 December 1981, 3 February–14 April 1983, 7 April–17 June 1984, 4 August–16 October 1985, 3 October–16 December 1986, 20 November 1987 – 10 February 1988, 4 February–12 April 1989, 31 March–9 April 1990, 8 July −13 August 1991, 28 July–October 1992)
 Dyess Air Force Base, Texas, 1 October 1993 – present

Aircraft
 Principally Douglas C-47 Skytrain, 1942–1946
 Curtiss C-46 Commando, 1946–1948
 Douglas C-54 Skymaster, 1946–1949
 Fairchild C-119 Flying Boxcar, 1952–1957
 Lockheed C-130 hercules, 1957–1993, 1993–present

Unit awards and decorations
Military Airlift Command Outstanding Tactical Airlift Squadron of the Year:  1980, 1984, 1988, 1990

Air Mobility Command Outstanding Airlift Squadron of the Year: 2004, 2006

Air Force Outstanding Unit Award

References

Notes

Bibliography

External links
 World War II photos
 Global Security: 40 AS
 Army Institute of Heraldry: Unit Emblem

Military units and formations in Texas
040